William George Michael Spens, 2nd Baron Spens, QC (18 September 1914 – 23 November 1984) was a British peer.

Spens was the eldest son of Patrick Spens, 1st Baron Spens and his first wife, Hilda. He served with the 97th (Kent Yeomanry) Field Brigade, was promoted to Second Lieutenant in 1936 and transferred to the Royal Artillery in 1938. On 30 June 1941, Spens married Joan Goodall (died 1994) and they had three children:

Patrick Michael Rex (1942–2001)
William David Ralph (born 1943)
Mallowry Ann (born 1949)

In the Queen's Birthday Honours of 1954, Spens, as a Temporary Senior Executive Officer of the Control Commission for Germany, was appointed a Member of the Order of the British Empire (MBE).

On the death of Spens' father in 1973, he inherited the barony of Spens and on his own death in 1984, the title passed to his eldest son, Patrick.

His MBE honour was revoked in 1975, following his sentencing a year earlier, to two years in jail for stealing money from the Federation of British Carpet Manufacturers, a company he founded and of which he was a director.

References

1914 births
1984 deaths
Barons in the Peerage of the United Kingdom
Royal Artillery officers
British people convicted of theft
People stripped of a British Commonwealth honour
Place of birth missing
20th-century British Army personnel